The 1923 Wimbledon Championships took place on the outdoor grass courts at the All England Lawn Tennis and Croquet Club in Wimbledon, London, United Kingdom. The tournament ran from 25 June until 7 July. It was the 43rd staging of the Wimbledon Championships, and the first Grand Slam tennis event of 1923.

Champions

Men's singles

 Bill Johnston defeated  Frank Hunter, 6–0, 6–3, 6–1

Women's singles

 Suzanne Lenglen defeated  Kitty McKane, 6–2, 6–2

Men's doubles

 Leslie Godfree /  Randolph Lycett defeated  Eduardo Flaquer /  Manuel de Gomar, 6–3, 6–4, 3–6, 6–3

Women's doubles

 Suzanne Lenglen /  Elizabeth Ryan defeated  Joan Austin /  Evelyn Colyer, 6–3, 6–1

Mixed doubles

 Randolph Lycett /  Elizabeth Ryan defeated  Lewis Deane /  Dorothy Shepherd-Barron, 6–4, 7–5

References

External links
 Official Wimbledon Championships website

 
Wimbledon Championships
Wimbledon Championships
Wimbledon Championships
Wimbledon Championships